President Roh may refer to:
 Roh Tae-woo (1932–2021), 13th president of South Korea
 Roh Moo-hyun (1946–2009), 16th president of South Korea